TFN (formerly known as T1419), is a South Korean–Japanese boy band formed in 2021 under MLD Entertainment. The group consists of nine members: Noa, Sian, Kevin, Gunwoo, Leo, On, Zero, Kairi and Kio. They debuted on January 11, 2021, with their single album Before Sunrise Part. 1.

History

2020–2021: Debut with Before Sunrise series 
On October 13, 2020, MLD Entertainment announced they would be launching a new boy group in December in partnership with NHN Entertainment Corporation and Sony Music. The group would debut not only in Korea but also in Japan and the United States, simultaneously. It was later announced that MLD had signed a business partner agreement with ICM Partners for activities in the U.S. The following day, a pre-teaser photo was released featuring all the members. On October 17, a schedule was released for the non-promoted pre-debut release, the group was said to be releasing a music video for "Dracula" on October 27.

On January 11, 2021, they debuted with their first single album, Before Sunrise Part. 1, and its lead single "Asurabalbalta".

On March 31, 2021, T1419 returned with their second single album, Before Sunrise Part. 2, and its lead single "Exit".

On August 23, 2021, T1419 released their third single album, Before Sunrise Part. 3, and its lead single "Flex".

On December 2, 2021, T1419 released the digital single, "Red Light, Green Light".

2022–present: Japanese debut, first Spanish single and rebranding 
On March 9, 2022, T1419 made their Japanese debut with the extended play, Our Teen: Blue Side, and its lead single "Run Up".  The Korean version of the lead single was released on May 9, 2022.

On March 22, 2022, T1419 released the digital single, "Edelweiss".

On July 3, 2022, T1419 released their first Spanish single, "When The Sun Goes Down".

In August 2022, T1419 joined the Weverse platform.

On October 17, 2022, MLD Entertainment announced that the group's name would be renamed as TFN.

On November 15, 2022, TFN made a guest appearance on the Filipino variety show It's Showtime as they performed their single, "Amazon".

Members
Adapted from their Naver profile and website profile.

 Noa (노아)
 Sian (시안)
 Kevin (케빈)
 Gunwoo (건우)
 Leo (레오)
 On (온)
 Zero (제로)
 Kairi (카이리)
 Kio (키오)

Discography

Extended plays

Single albums

Singles

Filmography

Reality shows

Awards and nominations

References

External links
  

2021 establishments in South Korea
Musical groups from Seoul
K-pop music groups
Musical groups established in 2021
South Korean dance music groups
South Korean boy bands